The 1985–86 Sporting de Gijón season was the 26th season of the club in La Liga, the 12th consecutive after its last promotion.

Overview 
On 28 February 1987, Real Sporting beat Barcelona by 0–4, thus becoming the largest win away of the club in La Liga.

After the regular season, Real Sporting qualified for the top group and finished the season in the fourth position, finally achieving qualification for the UEFA Cup.

Squad

Competitions

La Liga

For the 1986–87 season, La Liga changed its format and after the classical round-robin tournament, teams were divided into three groups according to their league table where the six first teams would play for the title, teams between 7th and 12th for classification and the last six for avoiding the relegation.

These groups of the second stage consisted in a new round-robin tournament adding ten more rounds to the calendar.

Results by round

League table

Matches
Regular season

Second stage

Copa del Rey

Matches

Squad statistics

Appearances and goals

|}

Notes

References

External links
Profile at BDFutbol
Official website

Sporting de Gijón seasons
Sporting de Gijon